Stanley Clive Perry Turnbull (22 December 1906 – 25 May 1975) was an Australian writer and journalist.

He was born in Glenorchy in Tasmania. He joined The Mercury newspaper as a reporter in 1922 and then moved to Melbourne where he worked on The Herald. He is best known for his book Black War that examined the extermination of Indigenous Australians in Tasmania. He also wrote a series of biographies.

Bibliography

 Black War: The Extermination of the Tasmanian Aborigines, F. W. Cheshire, 1943; Sun Books, 1948 
 A Concise History of Australia, Thames and Hudson, 1965.

References
 The Australian Dictionary of Biography

1906 births
1975 deaths
Australian biographers
Male biographers
20th-century biographers
20th-century male writers
20th-century Australian journalists
The Mercury (Hobart) people